Foss O. Eldred (1884–1956) was Attorney General of Michigan in 1946 when he was appointed to fill out an unexpired term.  He also held many other political offices.

Eldred was from Ionia, Michigan.  He studied at Albion College and then Michigan State Normal College (now Eastern Michigan University), graduating with a degree in teaching from the latter.  He served as superintendent of schools in Lyons, Michigan and then was an assistant instructor of reading at Michigan State Normal College.

Eldred was a Republican.  He was a member of the Michigan State Senate from the 18th District from 1921 to 1924.  He then served as Prosecuting Attorney for Ionia County from 1925 to 1928.  In 1931 he ran unsuccessfully for Congress in the Michigan 8th Congressional District, losing to Michael J. Hart by 5,000 votes largely because Eldred supported prohibition and Hart was a hard-core supporter of its repeal.  He was elected mayor of Ionia in 1935 and served as a delegate to the Republican National Convention in 1940.

Eldred married Erminie Mary; they had one son, Ney Eldred, who as of 1951 was Ionia County Prosecutor.

Sources
The Political Graveyard
Aurora, 1908

1884 births
1956 deaths
Republican Party Michigan state senators
Albion College alumni
Eastern Michigan University alumni
Eastern Michigan University faculty
Mayors of places in Michigan
People from Ionia, Michigan
Michigan Attorneys General
20th-century American educators
20th-century American lawyers
20th-century American politicians